George William Erskine Russell PC (3 February 1853 – 17 March 1919) was a British biographer, memoirist and Liberal politician.

Background and education
Russell was born in London, England, on 3 February 1853, the youngest son of Lord Charles Russell, sixth son of John Russell, 6th Duke of Bedford. His mother was Isabella Clarisa Davies, daughter of William Griffith Davies, of Penylan, Carmarthenshire. He was educated at Harrow and University College, Oxford.

Though he entered University College as a Scholar, he obtained only a Pass degree. Ill-health, particularly myelitis, put paid to any chance of academic distinction.

Political career
Russell was Liberal Member of Parliament for Aylesbury from 1880 to 1885, and for Biggleswade from 1892 to 1895. He was appointed by William Ewart Gladstone as Parliamentary Secretary to the Local Government Board from 1883 to 1885 and as Under-Secretary of State for India from 1892 to 1894.  Under Lord Rosebery he was Under-Secretary of State for the Home Department from 1894 to 1895. He was also an Alderman on London County Council from 1889 to 1895. He was appointed a Privy Counsellor in 1907, and held the honorary degree of LLD from St Andrews University. He was the author of the biography The Right Honourable William Ewart Gladstone (1891).  Russell was a journalist by profession, and a close ally of the Grand Old Man, a home ruler, when Gladstone presented the bill to the Commons for the second time on 13 February 1893.

Personal life
Russell died, unmarried, at 18 Wilton Street, London, on 17 March 1919, aged 66.

Photographs
The Victoria and Albert Museum's photograph of Russell can be seen online.

Selected publications

References

External links

 
 
 

1853 births
1919 deaths
Liberal Party (UK) MPs for English constituencies
Members of the Privy Council of the United Kingdom
UK MPs 1880–1885
UK MPs 1892–1895
Members of London County Council
People educated at Harrow School
Alumni of University College, Oxford
George
Progressive Party (London) politicians